Breathe is the fifth studio album by Swedish singer Pandora. It was released in February 1999 by Universal Records.

Track listing 
 "You'll Be Alright" (Daniel Andreasson, Daniel Papalexis) – 3:46
 "My Own Way" (Pandora, Papalexis) – 4:01
 "You Don't Want to Know" (Papalexis, Kadir Taysir, Rami Yacoub) – 3:42
 "Talk to Me" (Kee Marcello, Kurt Sahlén) – 3:31
 "Free Zone" (Pandora, Mats Nyman) – 3:40
 "Breathe" (Pandora, Nyman) – 4:06
 "Mama" (Pandora, Nyman) – 3:59
 "Tell Me" (Papalexis, Yacoub) – 3:50
 "I Can Get It" (Pandora, Papalexis) – 4:25
 "Love Don't Need No Lies" (Papalexis, Taysir) – 3:42
 "A Broken Soul" (Pandora, Nyman) – 4:00
 "Act of Faith" (Diane Warren) – 4:08
 "Do You Want Me Back" (Pandora, Papalexis, Jocelyn Mathieu, Marko Rakascan) – 3:22
 "Sayonara" (Marcello, Sahlén) – 3:15
 "Bright Eyes" (Mike Batt) – 3:47  (bonus track) 
 "This Could Be Heaven" (Single Edit)  (Mark Taylor, Paul Barry) – 4:02  (bonus track)

Release history

Certifications

References 

1999 albums
Pandora (singer) albums
Universal Records albums